Ponitrie Protected Landscape Area is one of the 14 protected landscape areas in Slovakia. The Landscape Area is situated in the Tribeč and Vtáčnik mountains, in western Slovakia. It is situated in the Nitra, Zlaté Moravce, Žarnovica, Topoľčany, Partizánske and Prievidza districts.

History
The park was created on 24 June 1985. Protected areas declared before include Dobrotínske skaly (1980), Makovište (1973), Solčiansky háj (1984), and Zoborská lesostep (1952).

Geography and geology
Although the PLA's territory is compact, it is made of two different landscapes. Vtáčnik, in the north is a range of volcanic origin and is part of the Slovenské stredohorie mountains. Beech and fir trees dominate in the area. Tribeč, in the south, is a crystalline mountain range built on granitoide rocks, limestone and dolomite. Beech, hornbeam and in higher locations oak forests are covering the area.

References

External links
 Ponitrie PLA at Slovakia.travel

Protected areas of Slovakia
Protected areas established in 1985
Protected areas of the Western Carpathians
Geography of Nitra Region
Tourist attractions in Nitra Region
Geography of Banská Bystrica Region
Tourist attractions in Banská Bystrica Region
Geography of Trenčín Region
Tourist attractions in Trenčín Region
1985 establishments in Czechoslovakia